Doberschütz or von Doberschütz is a German language habitational surname. Notable people with the name include:
 Elizabeth of Doberschütz (died 1591), victim of witch hunts in Neustettin
 Gerlinde Doberschütz (born 1964), German rower
 Jens Doberschütz (born 1957), German rower
 Melchior of Doberschütz (16th-century), member of the Silesian noble family of Doberschütz

References 

German-language surnames
German toponymic surnames